Lucky Debonair (May 2, 1962 – July 10, 1987) was an American Thoroughbred racehorse best known for winning the 1965 Kentucky Derby.

Background
He was bred by owners Dan and Ada Rice of Wheaton, Illinois at their Danada Farm satellite operation on Old Frankfort Pike near Lexington, Kentucky, a property that once was part of the Idle Hour Stock Farm. Lucky Debonair was sired by Vertex out of the mare Fresh as Fresh, who was a daughter of the 1943 U.S. Triple Crown Champion Count Fleet.

He was conditioned for racing by trainer Frank Catrone,

Racing career
As a two-year-old in 1964, Lucky Debonair made one start at the Atlantic City Race Course, where he finished out of the money. Sent to race in California at age three, the unheralded colt was ridden by Bill Shoemaker. He finished second in the San Felipe Stakes and won the San Vicente Handicap, both at Santa Anita Park in Arcadia. He was a supplementary entrant in the West Coast's most important race for three-year-olds, the Santa Anita Derby. Under Shoemaker, Lucky Debonair won the race by four lengths and set a new stakes record of 1:47.00, a time that as of 2008 has been equaled but not broken. He followed this victory with another very important win in the Blue Grass Stakes at Keeneland Race Course and was made the second choice among bettors for the Kentucky Derby.

Lucky Debonair gave Shoemaker his third Derby win by defeating ten other top three-year-olds, including the heavily favored American Champion Two-Year-Old Colt of 1964 Bold Lad (10th), the brilliantly fast Ogden Phipps colt Dapper Dan (2nd), future U.S. Racing Hall of Fame inductee Tom Rolfe (3rd), and Hail To All (5th).  In the second leg of the Triple Crown, the Preakness Stakes, a bruised ankle that almost caused him to be withdrawn from the race contributed to  Lucky Debonair finishing seventh. The colt did not run in the Belmont Stakes.

Lucky Debonair returned to racing at age four in 1966. He won three of five starts, including a win over Native Diver in California's prestigious Santa Anita Handicap.

Stud record
Retired to stud duty at the Rices' farm in Kentucky, before being sent to Venezuela in 1976 when the then-widowed Ada Rice disbanded her racing stable. He produced fifteen stakes winners including the Irish Derby winner Malacate.

Lucky Debonair died of old age in 1987 at age twenty-five. On May 4, 2002, the city of Wheaton, Illinois honored him with a plaque and memorial rock at the Danada Equestrian Center.

Pedigree

References

 Lucky Debonair important victories and placings and offspring at Classic Runners
 May 15, 1965 Sports Illustrated article on Lucky Debonair

1962 racehorse births
1987 racehorse deaths
Racehorses bred in Kentucky
Racehorses trained in the United States
Kentucky Derby winners
Thoroughbred family 3-d